The Malkoçoğlu or Yahyalı was an Ottoman Serbian noble family whose members led the akıncı corps of the empire between the 14th–16th centuries. They served mainly in the Balkan conquest of the empire. The members of the family usually served as beys, sancak-beys, beylerbeys, paşas and castle commanders. Later on they joined the ranks of the Ottoman Army in various missions, and one of the descendants became a Grand Vizier.

History
The Battle of Maritsa (1371) was a disaster for the Serbian Empire, which resulted in several Serbian and Bulgarian lords becoming Ottoman vassals. The Malkoçoğlu was a warrior family of Christian Serb origin, which became Muslim. Malkoç, the eponymous founder, is alleged to have been one of the commanders of Sultan Murad I and Bayezid I, fighting at Kosovo (1389) and at Nicopolis (1396).

The further Ottoman expansion to the European frontiers was shared with semi-independent warriors, with the most notable being the four families of Evrenosoğulları, Mihaloğulları, both of which were of Anatolian Christian origin, Turahanoğulları of undetermined Christian origin, and the Malkoçoğulları. These four families made up the gazi (warrior) nobility. Unpaid they lived and operated as raiders on the frontiers of the Ottoman Empire, subsisting totally on plunder.

Members
Genealogy known
Hamza
Malkoçoğlu Yahya Paşa bin Hamza (died 1507), married to a daughter of Bayezid II.
Mehmed ( 1511), Rumelian commander, supported Selim I during the throne struggle.
Balı (died 1514), commander, had two sons, Ali and Tur Ali, all three died at Chaldiran.
Ali (died 1514)
Tur Ali (died 1514)

Genealogy unknown
Balı bin Yahya Paşa (died 1548)
Malkoçoğlu Balı Bey (1495–1554), gazi commander. Probably one of the commanders under Grand Vizier Sokollu Mehmed Pasha that participated in the Safavid Campaign (1554–55).
Malkoč-beg (died 1565)
Ahmed-paša Dugalić
Malkoç-oğlu Bâlibey of Semendire
Yavuz Ali Paşa, Grand Vizier from October 16, 1603 to July 26, 1604.

Legacy 

There is a Bosnian Muslim epic tradition about an Ottoman hero named Malkoč-bey.

Malkoçoğlu Cem Sultan, 1969 Turkish action film

References

Sources

Ottoman Serbia
Families from the Ottoman Empire
People from the Ottoman Empire of Serbian descent
14th-century people from the Ottoman Empire
15th-century people from the Ottoman Empire
16th-century people from the Ottoman Empire
History of Silistra